In group theory, the term pariah was introduced by Robert Griess in  to refer to the six sporadic simple groups which are not subquotients of the monster group.

The twenty groups which are subquotients, including the monster group itself, he dubbed the happy family.

For example, the orders of J4 and the Lyons Group Ly are divisible by 37.  Since 37 does not divide the order of the monster, these cannot be subquotients of it; thus J4 and Ly  are pariahs.  Three other sporadic groups were also shown to be pariahs by Griess in 1982, and the Janko Group J1 was shown to be the final pariah by Robert A. Wilson in 1986. The complete list is shown below.

References

 Robert A. Wilson (1986). Is J1 a subgroup of the monster?, Bull. London Math. Soc. 18, no. 4 (1986), 349-350

Sporadic groups